David Schickler (born July 30, 1969, in Rochester, New York) is an American screenwriter and author, most recently of the memoir The Dark Path, published by Riverhead Books in September 2013. He is the co-creator and an executive producer of the Cinemax television series Banshee, which premiered in 2013. He is the author of the New York Times bestselling short story collection Kissing in Manhattan (2001) and the nationally bestselling novel Sweet and Vicious (2004). He has written original and adapted scripts for Universal, Lions Gate, Sidney Kimmel and Wildwood Films.

His books have been published in nine countries and his stories have appeared in The New Yorker, Travel + Leisure, and Zoetrope: All-Story, as well as on Selected Shorts. His short story "The Smoker" won an O. Henry Award and was optioned by Paramount Pictures.

Schickler graduated from McQuaid Jesuit High School. He received his undergraduate degree from Georgetown University and Masters from Columbia University. He now lives in Rochester, NY with his wife and children.

Works

Filmography

Television

Creator

Producer

Writer

Bibliography 
 Kissing in Manhattan (short story collection) (2001) 
 Sweet and Vicious (novel) (2004) 
 The Dark Path (memoir) (2013)

References

External links 

 David Schickler Home
 
 Banshee
 David Schickler Interview
 Full text of "Fourth Angry Mouse" by David Schickler
 'Banshee,’ Cinemax’s Deliciously Over-the-Top Carnival of Sex and Violence, Is Must-See TV

21st-century American novelists
American male novelists
Walsh School of Foreign Service alumni
Columbia University alumni
1969 births
Living people
American male short story writers
21st-century American short story writers
21st-century American male writers